The Himalayan whiskered bat (Myotis siligorensis) is a species of vesper bat. It is found in Bangladesh, Bhutan, Cambodia, China, India, Indonesia, Laos, Malaysia, Nepal, and Vietnam.

References

Mouse-eared bats
Mammals of Bangladesh
Mammals of Nepal
Taxonomy articles created by Polbot
Mammals described in 1855
Taxa named by Thomas Horsfield
Bats of Asia